Grayson Greer Rodriguez (born November 16, 1999) is an American professional baseball pitcher in the Baltimore Orioles organization.

Amateur career
Rodriguez attended Central Heights High School in Nacogdoches, Texas. As a junior, he went 14–1 with a 0.38 ERA, leading Central Heights to the 3A state title. He signed to play college baseball at Texas A&M University.

Professional career
The Baltimore Orioles selected Rodriguez in the first round, with the 11th overall selection, of the 2018 Major League Baseball draft. On June 12, 2018, Rodriguez signed with the Orioles for $4.3 million. He made his professional debut with the Gulf Coast League Orioles and spent the whole season there, going 0–2 with a 1.40 ERA in nine games (eight starts).

Rodriguez spent 2019 with the Delmarva Shorebirds, earning South Atlantic League All-Star honors. That July, Rodriguez represented the Orioles at the 2019 All-Star Futures Game. Over twenty starts with Delmarva, he went 10–4 with a 2.68 ERA, striking out 129 batters over 94 innings. Rodriguez did not play in a game in 2020 due to the cancellation of the minor league season because of the COVID-19 pandemic.

To begin 2021, he was assigned to the Aberdeen IronBirds. He was promoted to the Bowie Baysox during the season. Over 23 starts between the two teams, he went 9–1 with a 2.36 ERA and 161 strikeouts over 103 innings.

Rodriguez was assigned to the Triple-A Norfolk Tides to begin the 2022 season. On June 2, 2022, it was announced that Rodriguez would miss time with a right lat muscle strain. He had compiled a 2.09 ERA in 11 starts with Norfolk at the time of his injury.

References

External links

1999 births
Living people
People from Nacogdoches, Texas
Baseball pitchers
Baseball players from Texas
Gulf Coast Orioles players
Delmarva Shorebirds players
Aberdeen IronBirds players
Bowie Baysox players
Norfolk Tides players